The 2022 Cook Out Southern 500, the 73rd running of the event,   was a  NASCAR Cup Series race that was held on September 4, 2022, at Darlington Raceway in Darlington, South Carolina. Contested over 367 laps on the  egg-shaped oval, it was the 27th race of the 2022 NASCAR Cup Series season, the first race of the 2022 NASCAR playoff, and the first race of the Round of 16.

Erik Jones won, the first race win for Legacy Motor Club.

Report

Background

Darlington Raceway is a race track built for NASCAR racing located near Darlington, South Carolina. It is nicknamed "The Lady in Black" and "The Track Too Tough to Tame" by many NASCAR fans and drivers and advertised as "A NASCAR Tradition." It is of a unique, somewhat egg-shaped design, an oval with the ends of very different configurations, a condition which supposedly arose from the proximity of one end of the track to a minnow pond the owner refused to relocate. This situation makes it very challenging for the crews to set up their cars' handling in a way that is effective at both ends.

Surface Issues
Darlington Raceway was last repaved following the May 2007 meeting (from 2005 to 2019, there was only one meeting;  the second meeting was reinstated in 2020), and from 2008 to 2019, there was one night race.  In 2020, a day race returned to the schedule, and instead of two races (one Xfinity and one Cup) during the entire year, the track hosted six races (three Cup, two Xfinity, and one Truck).  The circuit kept repairing the circuit with patches during each summer before the annual Cup race in September.  The circuit's narrow Turn 2 rapidly deteriorated with cracks in the tarmac allowing water to seep in the circuit.  In July 2021, the circuit repaved a six hundred foot section at the entrance of Turn 2 and ending at the exit of the turn to repair the tarmac and resolve the issue for safety and to reduce the threat of weepers and surface issues in that section of the circuit.

Entry list
 (R) denotes rookie driver.
 (i) denotes driver who is ineligible for series driver points.

Practice

Practice results

Qualifying

Qualifying results

Race

Stage Results

Stage One
Laps: 115

Stage Two
Laps: 115

Final Stage Results

Stage Three
Laps: 137

Race statistics
 Lead changes: 21 among 11 different drivers
 Cautions/Laps: 9 for 58
 Red flags: 0
 Time of race: 4 hours, 9 minutes and 49 seconds
 Average speed:

Media

Television
USA covered the race on the television side. Rick Allen, two–time Darlington winner Jeff Burton, Steve Letarte and Dale Earnhardt Jr. called Stages 1 and 3 of the race from the broadcast booth. Earnhardt Jr., Dale Jarrett and Kyle Petty called Stage 2 of the race from the broadcast booth. Dave Burns, Kim Coon, Parker Kligerman and Marty Snider handled the pit road duties from pit lane.

Radio
MRN had the radio call for the race, which was also simulcast on Sirius XM NASCAR Radio.

Standings after the race

Drivers' Championship standings

Manufacturers' Championship standings

Note: Only the first 16 positions are included for the driver standings.

Notes

References

2022 NASCAR Cup Series
NASCAR races at Darlington Raceway
September 2022 sports events in the United States
2022 in sports in South Carolina